Marine Medium Tiltrotor Squadron 161 (VMM-161) is a United States Marine Corps tiltrotor squadron that operates the MV-22 Osprey. The squadron, known as the "Greyhawks", is based at Marine Corps Air Station Miramar, California and falls under the command of Marine Aircraft Group 16 (MAG-16) and the 3rd Marine Aircraft Wing (3rd MAW). The squadron has the distinction of being the first helicopter transport squadron in the world and regularly utilizes the phrase “The First, The Best”.

Mission:

Provide assault support transport of combat troops, supplies and equipment during expeditionary, joint or combined operations. Be prepared for short-notice, worldwide employment in support of Marine Air-Ground Task Force operations.

History

Korean War & the early 1960s
The squadron was commissioned on January 15, 1951 at Marine Corps Air Station El Toro, California, as Marine Helicopter Transport Squadron 161 (HMR-161), Air Fleet Marine Force Pacific.  The squadron moved a month later to Marine Corps Air Facility Santa Ana, California to train on their new helicopter, the Sikorsky HRS-1. Except for the commanding officer, LtCol George Herring, most pilots in the squadron had flown fighters during World War II. In August 1951 the squadron deployed to South Korea and attached to the 1st Marine Aircraft Wing (1st MAW), where it operated in the central and the western fronts.

While not the first ever ship to shore helicopter flight with Marines aboard, that having been done by HMR-162 during Operation Lex Baker off the coast of Southern California in February, 1952, it was the first on foreign shores. During the course of the Korean War, HMR-161 flew 16,538 hours during 18,607 sorties eventually accounting for over 60,000 troop movements and moving 7.5 million pounds of cargo. The squadron then participated in the defense of the Korean Demilitarized Zone (DMZ) from July 1953 to March 1955. The squadron then relocated that month to Marine Corps Air Station Kaneohe Bay, Hawaii, and attached to Marine Aircraft Group 13 (MAG 13).
While in Hawaii, HMR-161 was redesignated on December 31, 1956 as Marine Helicopter Transport Squadron (Light) 161 (HMR(L)-161), MAG 13, 1st MAW. In May 1960, the Squadron received the new Sikorsky H-34 Seahorse.

On February 1, 1962, the unit was once again re-designated as Marine Medium Helicopter Squadron 161 (HMM-161), MAG 13, 1st Marine Brigade. On October 3, 1962 the squadron assisted NASA by recovering astronaut Wally Schirra and his Project Mercury capsule Sigma Seven out of the Pacific after a successful launch into space.

During 1963, Marine Medium Helicopter Squadron 161 (HMM-161) assisted in several biological warfare tests conducted under Project SHAD  at Pearl Harbor, Kaneohe Naval Air Station and in the Pacific Ocean, near Oahu, Hawaii.  The rest of the early 1960s were spent conducting anti-guerrilla training in preparation for deployment to South Vietnam.

Vietnam War and the 1980s 

On April 27 the squadron departed Okinawa onboard the  headed for South Vietnam. Finally on May 25, 1965, HMM-161 came ashore at Chu Lai and was assigned under the command of Marine Aircraft Group 16 (MAG-16), and the 1st Marine Aircraft Wing (1st MAW). On June 12 the squadron again relocated, this time to the Phu Bai Combat Base. 

On January 4, 1966 HMM-161 was relieved by HMM-163 and redeployed to Marine Corps Air Station Futenma, Okinawa to receive its new Vertol CH-46 Sea Knights. During this deployment to Vietnam the squadron had one pilot awarded the Silver Star and another eleven awarded the Distinguished Flying Cross By April 1966, the squadron had redeployed to Da Nang, South Vietnam with a move to Phu Bai that June. On September 25, 1966 a UH-34D HUS from HMM-161 was struck by a friendly artillery shell while conducting a medevac mission during Operation Prairie resulting in the death all five Marines on board. It is the only known case of friendly artillery fire shooting down an American helicopter during the war. The squadron relocated once again in November 1966 to Futenma, Okinawa, where it was attached to Marine Aircraft Group 15 (MAG-15), 9th Marine Amphibious Brigade. A month later the squadron returned to CONUS, as they were attached to Marine Aircraft Group 26 (MAG-26), 2d MAW at Marine Corps Air Station New River, North Carolina. HMM-161 then redeployed in May 1968 to Quảng Trị Combat Base, South Vietnam and attached to provisional Marine Aircraft Group 39 (MAG-39), 1st MAW. The Squadron finished its Vietnam years with its final deployment to Phu Bai in October 1969 while attached to MAG-16, 1st MAW.

HMM-161 came home in September 1970 and attached to MAG-56, 3rd Marine Aircraft Wing, Fleet Marine Force Pacific. It was reassigned in July 1971 to MAG-16, 3d MAW.  Elements of the Squadron participated in the August 1989 cleanup of the Exxon Valdez oil spill in Prince William Sound, Alaska.

The Gulf War and the 1990s 

In 1990 they deployed on August 17 to Saudi Arabia as part of MAG-70, 7th Marine Expeditionary Brigade in support of Operation Desert Shield. The squadron would eventually participate in Operation Desert Storm in Saudi Arabia and Kuwait. In 1995, they participated in Operation United Shield, the withdrawal of United Nations Forces from Somalia. By the end of the year, the unit had relocated to MCAS El Toro, California. In 1997, the Greyhawks deployed in March aboard the USS Boxer to the WESTPAC and Persian Gulf as the ACE for the 15th MEU(SOC), where they flew missions in support of Operation Southern Watch in Iraq.  In February 1999, HMM-161 moved from MCAS El Toro to MCAS Miramar, California.

Global War on Terror

The new millennium began well for the Squadron, as it won the Edward C. Dyer Marine Medium Helicopter Squadron of the Year for 2001. This followed the 2000 WESTPAC Deployment, which saw the Greyhawks provide humanitarian assistance in East Timor.  On January 6, 2003, HMM-161 (Rein) deployed as a part of the 15th MEU for a WESTPAC Float that would end up supporting Operation Enduring Freedom and Operation Iraqi Freedom.  The Greyhawks were assigned the mission of Tactical Recovery of Aircraft and Personnel (TRAP). Although no TRAP missions were necessary during the OIF, the Squadron did fly Casevac and numerous other missions.  The Squadron returned home to MCAS Miramar on July 12, 2003.

In November 2003, Marines of HMM-161 were told they would be redeploying to Iraq for Operation Iraqi Freedom II (OIF II). Immediate preparations were begun, and the Squadron used its December deployment to Indian Springs, Nevada to train for the conditions that would be faced during OIF II. While at Indian Springs, the Marines of HMM-161 made their mark in Squadron history by surpassing the 40,000 mishap-free flight hours plateau. This climb into the history books began back in August 1995 and culminated with a ground crew appreciation flight over the Hoover Dam and the Las Vegas Strip.

After receiving its cargo and aircraft at Ash Shu'aybah Port, Kuwait, the Squadron flew up to Al Taqaddum, Iraq during the first week of March to set up for the relief in place with the 82nd Airborne Brigade.  The Squadron made 752 consecutive mission launches in support of I MEF operations during OIF II, logging 3072.8 hours of flight time. The Greyhawks were relieved on September 1, 2004 by HMM-268 with the main body arriving back at MCAS Miramar on September 6. Throughout their service during OIF II, the Greyhawks moved 116,480 pounds of cargo and 2,929 passengers, including 328 patients that needed urgent care.

In August 2005, the squadron redeployed to Iraq for its third OIF deployment.  The Greyhawks provided around-the-clock casualty evacuation and assault support in Al Anbar Province.  During this deployment, the squadron flew 5,199 combat flight hours, transported more than 2,100 wounded personnel and conducted 19 raids and assault support missions that led to the capture of numerous insurgents. The Greyhawks safely completing 2,999 assault support requests without mishap or damage from enemy action.

On February 8, 2006, HMM-161 marked their 50,000th flight hour without a Class "A" mishap during their latest deployment to Al Taqaddum, Iraq.  During this time period, which began February 19, 1995, the squadron flew 9,100 combat hours during three combat deployments.

The squadron returned from its third OIF deployment on March 4, 2006. Following the deployment the squadron was awarded its fourth consecutive Chief of Naval Operations Safety Award and the Marine Corps Aviation Association's 2006 Commandant's Aviation Award in recognition as the year's best overall performance by a Marine squadron.

On February 3, 2007, HMM-161 embarked upon its fourth combat deployment in support of Operation Iraqi Freedom and the Global War on Terror by sending a small advance party back to Al Taqaddum, Iraq to prepare for the arrival of the Squadron's Main Body on March 1.  The Greyhawks officially resumed their role in Casualty Evacuations and General Support on March 9, 2007.

On September 24, HMM-161 returned from Al Taqaddum, Iraq, with their CASEVAC bell, the symbol of their mission in the area. They took the bell with them instead of leaving it for the next squadron because the mission of CASEVAC had been temporarily turned over to the soldiers of an Army Blackhawk detachment on the same base.

At the completion of their deployment, HMM-161 successfully logged a record of over 58,000 class A mishap free flight hours total. This achievement is will remain intact and be unable to be surpassed by any other CH-46E squadron due to the fact the new MV-22 Osprey will be replacing the CH-46E, and no other squadron has a record close enough to the Greyhawks' that they would be able to beat it. This milestone once again showed why the men and women of the Greyhawks are “The First, The Best”.

In December 2009, HMM-161 became the first of ten west coast squadrons to transition to the MV-22 Osprey and was redesignated as Marine Medium Tiltrotor Squadron 161 during the change of command.

VMM-161 completed its operational training requirements to the MV-22 Osprey and became a fully capable, combat ready tiltrotor squadron in April 2011. Shortly thereafter, in July 2012, the Greyhawks deployed to Afghanistan to support Operation Enduring Freedom as the first combat deployment for the MV-22.  The squadron completed the deployment and subsequently returned safely to MCAS Miramar in January 2013, having flown more than 2,200 hours, supporting more than 100 named operations, and suffering zero mishaps.

See also

 United States Marine Corps Aviation
 List of active United States Marine Corps aircraft squadrons
 List of decommissioned United States Marine Corps aircraft squadrons

Citations

References

Bibliography

 Montross, Lynn. Cavalry of the Sky - The Story of U.S. Marine Combat Helicopters. New York: Harper & Brothers, 1954.

External links

 
 USMC Sikorsky HRS Database
 HMM161 (Rein): Aviation Combat Eelement at the Ready - Naval Aviation News (May–June 2003)

VMM161